Greater Pittston is a  region in Luzerne County, Pennsylvania, in reference to the area in and around Pittston. As of 2010, the total population of Greater Pittston is 48,020. This region includes Avoca, Dupont, Duryea, Exeter Boro, Exeter Township, Hughestown, Jenkins Township, Laflin, Pittston Township, West Pittston, West Wyoming, Wyoming, and Yatesville.

History 

 1770s: English men, women, and children (European-Americans) started to settle in the Wyoming Valley of Northeastern Pennsylvania. 
 1 July 1778: During the Revolutionary War, Fort Jenkins (a patriot stockade in present-day West Pittston) surrendered to the British (under Major John Butler). It was later burned to the ground. 
 3 July 1778: A force of British soldiers, led by John Butler, with the assistance of about 700 Indians, attacked and killed nearly 300 Wyoming Valley settlers. Today in the Borough of Wyoming, a monument marks the gravesite of the victims from the Battle of Wyoming.
 4 July 1778: Fort Pittston (located in what is now Pittston City) surrendered to the British and some of it was partially destroyed. It was later restored and used until the end of the Revolutionary War. 
 September 1778: Revenge for the Wyoming defeat was taken by American Colonel Thomas Hartley who, with 200 soldiers, burned nine to twelve Seneca, Delaware and Mingo villages along the Susquehanna River in northeast Pennsylvania, including Tioga and Chemung. 
 1833: The Wyoming Monument was constructed in Wyoming to commemorate the 1778 battle and the gravesite of the victims from the massacre. 
 28 June 1896: The Newton Coal Company's Twin Shaft Mine in Pittston City caved-in and killed 58 miners.
 1908 – 1912: The anthracite coal mining industry, and its extensive use of child labor in the early part of the 20th century, was one of the industries targeted by the National Child Labor Committee and its hired photographer, Lewis Hine. Many of Hine's subjects were photographed in the mines and coal fields in and around Pittston during this time. The impact of the Hine photographs led to the enactment of child labor laws across the country.
 1930s – 1980s: Pittston City emerged as a national center for clothing manufacturing. Thousands of workers, mainly women, labored in many factories throughout the Greater Pittston area. One such woman was Susan Sebastianelli of Pittston Township. Most were members of the International Ladies' Garment Workers' Union (ILGWU) that gained higher wages, workplace health & safety improvements, and employee rights. The ILGWU was active in civic and political life throughout Pennsylvania.
 1934: The right arm of Hughestown resident, Harry Tompkins, was crushed by an Erie Railroad train. This resulted in the U.S. Supreme Court case, Erie Railroad Co. v. Tompkins, which laid the foundation for a large part of modern American civil procedure.
 1945 – 1947: Construction of the Wilkes-Barre/Scranton International Airport took place near the Borough of Avoca. 
 22 January 1959: The Knox Mine Disaster in Port Griffith, Jenkins Township, claimed the lives of 12 people and essentially shut down the mining industry in Northeastern Pennsylvania.
 June 1972: Hurricane Agnes was responsible for massive flooding in and around the Greater Pittston area.
 1974 – 1989: Alleged ghost hauntings took place in the home of Jack and Janet Smurl in West Pittston, inspiring the 1991 film The Haunted.
 25 September 1982: George Banks kills 13 people in a shooting rampage in Wilkes-Barre and Jenkins Township.
 1992: The opening scenes from the movie School Ties was filmed in West Pittston; it shows David Green, the hero of the movie (played by Brendan Fraser), hanging out with friends in the streets of the tiny town.
 15 March 1993: Two Pittston firefighters (John Lombardo and Len Insalaco) were killed while fighting a blaze in the city's downtown. A monument was built and the nearby Water Street Bridge was renamed to commemorate their sacrifice.
 2008: The "kids for cash scandal" unfolded over judicial kickbacks at the Luzerne County Court of Common Pleas in Wilkes-Barre, Pennsylvania. Two judges, President Judge Mark Ciavarella and Senior Judge Michael Conahan, were convicted of accepting money from Robert Mericle, builder of two private, for-profit youth centers for the detention of juveniles. One center was PA Child Care (in Pittston Township). 
 2011: The Borough of Duryea received national attention for its role in the landmark Supreme Court case Borough of Duryea v. Guarnieri, in which the court stated that "a government employer's allegedly retaliatory actions against an employee do not give rise to liability under the Petition Clause unless the employee's petition relates to a matter of public concern."
 September 2011: The Greater Pittston area, along with the rest of Luzerne County, witnessed historical flooding from Tropical Storm Lee. The river topped the  level in flooding caused by Hurricane Agnes in 1972.

Establishment

Geography 

Greater Pittston is a  region in Luzerne County, Pennsylvania, encompassing the Susquehanna River. Yatesville is the smallest community in Greater Pittston. It covers a total area of only .

Ranking by area
The ranking of the following table is based on the area (or square mileage) of each community within Greater Pittston.

† principal city

Population 
 
According to the 2010 census, 48,020 people live in and around Pittston City. Pittston has the highest population with 7,739 citizens. Yatesville has the smallest population with around 600 citizens.

Population ranking
The population ranking of the following table is based on the 2010 census of Greater Pittston.

† principal city

Demographics
Demographics of Avoca
Demographics of Dupont
Demographics of Duryea
Demographics of Exeter
Demographics of Exeter Township
Demographics of Hughestown
Demographics of Jenkins Township
Demographics of Laflin
Demographics of Pittston City
Demographics of Pittston Township
Demographics of West Pittston
Demographics of West Wyoming
Demographics of Wyoming
Demographics of Yatesville

Government 
Each municipality (city, borough, and township) has its own form of government. Each city and borough is headed by an elected mayor. Each township is governed by a board of supervisors/commissioners.

Public safety
There are many fire and police departments scattered throughout Greater Pittston. The firefighters provide fire protection for all of its citizens. The police provide full-time protection to its citizens, visitors, businesses, and public property.

Healthcare
There are many healthcare clinics scattered throughout Greater Pittston. The following list is a small sample of health clinics in the region.  
 Garden Village Medical Center, West Pittston 
 Geisinger Medical Group, Pittston
 Geisinger Pittston, Pittston 
 Geisinger, Wyoming 
 Intermountain Medical Group, Dupont
 The Care and Concern Free Health Clinic, Pittston

Education

Public school districts
Pittston Area School District
Wyoming Area School District
Wilkes-Barre Area School District

Private schools
 Holy Rosary Elementary School, Duryea
 New Story School, Wyoming
 Wyoming Area Catholic Elementary School, Exeter

Libraries
 Pittston Memorial Library, Pittston City 
 West Pittston Library, West Pittston 
 Wyoming Free Library, Wyoming

Transportation

Highways
Interstate 81 passes near Pittston, heading north to Binghamton and south to Harrisburg. Pittston is also located near the Northeast Extension of the Pennsylvania Turnpike, Interstate 476, providing a link to Allentown and Philadelphia. U.S. Route 11, Pennsylvania Route 92, Pennsylvania Route 315, and Pennsylvania Route 502 can also be found within the region.

Public transportation
Pittston is served by the Luzerne County Transportation Authority and COLTS, which provides bus services to the city and other communities within Luzerne County and Lackawanna County. Martz Trailways also provides commuter, tour, and trip service from Pittston, and nearby locations in downtown Scranton and Wilkes-Barre to points east and south, such as Philadelphia, New York City, and Atlantic City.

Air
The Wilkes-Barre/Scranton International Airport is located in Pittston Township. The airport is served by eight international airlines and has hosted Air Force One on regional presidential visits several times in the past. In the spring of 2002, the airport began offering an increased number of non-stop flights across the nation. Service is provided by Allegiant, Delta, United Airlines, and American Airlines.

Rail
At present, the Reading Blue Mountain & Northern Railroad, Canadian Pacific Railway (successor to the Delaware and Hudson) and the Luzerne & Susquehanna Railroad (designated-operator of the county-owned shortline) provide freight service within the city and Pittston Township. A proposed nearby commuter train from Scranton to New York City has received government funding.

Notable people

 George Banks, mass murderer
 Albert K. Bender, UFO writer 
 Charles Calvin Bowman, mayor of Pittston and U.S. Representative from Pennsylvania
 James Joseph Brown, mining innovator
 Lou Butera, professional pool player
 Michael B. Carroll, PA state representative
 Jimmy Cefalo, Penn State football player, Miami Dolphins wide receiver, radio voice of the Miami Dolphins
 William D'Elia, mobster
 J. Harold Flannery, U.S. Representative from Pennsylvania
 Gene Guarilia, Boston Celtics
 James L. Hallock, Wisconsin state legislator
 Mike Hudock, professional football player
 Hughie Jennings, Major League Baseball player and manager
 Shawn Klush, Elvis tribute artist
 Marion Lorne, actress, was born in West Pittston.
 John D. MacArthur, businessman and philanthropist
 Tommy McMillan, Major League Baseball outfielder and shortstop
 Joseph Montione, radio personality
 Ray Musto, U.S. Representative from Pennsylvania
 Jay Parini, professor and author
 Thomas Tigue, Pennsylvania state legislator
 Charley Trippi, University of Georgia football player, 1943 Rose Bowl MVP, College Football Hall of Fame inductee, Chicago Cardinals quarterback and Pro Football Hall of Fame inductee. The football stadium at Pittston Area High School in Yatesville is named in his honor.

Gallery

References

Geography of Luzerne County, Pennsylvania
Pittston, Pennsylvania